The following is a list of awards won by the American newspaper The Washington Post.

Pulitzer Prizes 

The Washington Post has won 65 Pulitzer Prizes in journalism, the second highest of any newspaper or magazine in the United States. It has won the gold medal for Public Service, the most distinguished award, six times. The newspaper won its first prize in 1936 for Editorial Writing and its most recent in 2022.

General awards

Aldo Beckman Award 
The Aldo Beckman Award for Overall Excellence in White House Coverage, also known as The Aldo Beckman Award, is an annual award given by the White House Correspondents' Association for "overall excellence" in White House coverage.

Alfred I. duPont-Columbia University Award 
The Alfred I. duPont–Columbia University Award, presented by the Columbia University Graduate School of Journalism, honors excellence in broadcast and digital journalism.

Bastiat Prize 
The Bastiat Prize was an annual  journalism award, given by the Reason Foundation, that recognizes journalists whose writing "best demonstrates the importance of freedom with originality, wit, and eloquence."

Edward R. Murrow Award 
The Edward R. Murrow Award is an annual award that honors the best achievements in digital journalism.

George Polk Awards 
The George Polk Awards in Journalism, also known as the George Polk Awards, are an annual journalism award, given by Long Island University, honoring the best reporting in a number of categories.

Gerald Loeb Award 
The Gerald Loeb Award for Distinguished Business and Financial Journalism, also known as the Gerald Loeb Award, is a recognition of excellence in journalism, especially in the fields of business, finance and the economy.

Herblock Prize 
The Herblock Prize is an annual journalism award, given by the Herb Block Foundation, for excellence in editorial cartooning. The award is named after Post cartoonist Herbert Block.

Hillman Prize 
The Hillman Prize is an annual journalism award, presented by The Sidney Hillman Foundation, honoring journalists, writers, and public figures "who pursue social justice and public policy for the common good."

John Chancellor Award 
The John Chancellor Award for Excellence in Journalism, also known as the John Chancellor Award, is an annua journalisml award given by the Columbia University Graduate School of Journalism, honoring one reporting with "courage, character and integrity for cumulative professional accomplishments."

Livingston Awards 
The Livingston Awards is an annual journalism award, given by the University of Michigan, recognizing journalists under the age of 35 for local, national, and international coverage.

Peabody Award 
The George Foster Peabody Awards, also known as Peabody Awards or the Peabodys, is an annual award that recognizes distinguished achievement and meritorious public service by television and radio stations, networks, producing organizations, individuals, and the World Wide Web."

Robert F. Kennedy Journalism Award 
The Robert F. Kennedy Awards for Excellence in Journalism is an annual journalism award, named after Robert F. Kennedy, and given by the Robert F. Kennedy Center for Justice and Human Rights. The awards honor journalism's best work in several categories.

Scripps Howard Awards 
The Scripps Howard Awards is an annual journalism award, given by the Scripps Howard Foundation, that honors the best work in journalism across more than a dozen categories from multiple platforms, including television stations, networks, visual media, and newspapers.

Sigma Delta Chi Awards 
The Sigma Delta Chi Awards are an annual award, given by the Society of Professional Journalism, for excellence in journalism across multiple categories.

Walter Cronkite Award for Excellence in Journalism 
The Walter Cronkite Award for Excellence in Journalism is an annual award presented by Arizona State University's Walter Cronkite School of Journalism and Mass Communication. The recipient is deemed to represent a leading figure in the journalism industry, especially for ground-breaking achievements which have advanced the industry as a whole.

Investigative awards

Goldsmith Prize 
The Goldsmith Prize for Investigative Reporting, also known as the Goldsmith Prize, is an annual award for journalists administered by the Shorenstein Center on Media, Politics and Public Policy at Harvard University.

IRE Awards 
The Investigative Reporters and Editors Award, also known as the IRE Awards, is an annual journalism award given by the Investigative Reporters and Editors, a nonprofit organization located at the University of Missouri School of Journalism.

James Aronson Awards 
The James Aronson Awards for Social Justice Journalism, also known as the James Aronson Awards, is an annual journalism award given by Hunter College, that honors "original, written English-language reporting from the U.S. media that brings to light widespread injustices, their human consequences, underlying causes, and possible reforms."

Selden Ring Award 
The Selden Ring Award for Investigative Reporting, also known as the Selden Ring Award, is an annual journalism award given by the Annenberg School for Communication and Journalism at the University of Southern California, that recognizes investigating reporting that has made an impact.

Sidney Awards 
The Sidney Award is a monthly journalism award given out by The Sidney Hillman Foundation to "outstanding investigative journalism in service of the common good."

Toner Prizes 
The Toner Prizes for Excellence in Political Reporting, also known as The Toner Prize, is an annual award, presented by the S.I. Newhouse School of Public Communications of Syracuse University, that honors the "best U.S. national or local political reporting in any medium or on any platform—print, broadcast or online."

Worth Bingham Prize for Investigative Journalism 
The Worth Bingham Prize, also referred to as the Worth Bingham Prize for Investigative Reporting, is an annual journalism award, presented by the Nieman Foundation for Journalism at Harvard University, honoring "newspaper or magazine investigative reporting of stories of national significance where the public interest is being ill-served."

References 

The Washington Post
Journalism lists